Center Hill can refer to several places in the United States:

 Center Hill, Atlanta
 Center Hill, Florida
 Center Hill, Illinois
 Center Hill, North Carolina
 Center Hill, Texas
 Center Hill Lake, a reservoir in Tennessee